Pasajes Inmortales, is a Venezuelan album (LP), by the harpist Juan Vicente Torrealba, in this album he presents with his harp, the Venezuelan folklorical sort called the pasaje.

Track listing
Side A

"Nuevo Callao" (Folklore)
"María Laya" (Ignacio Figueredo/M. Hurtado)
"Pasaje Nº 2" (Folklore)
"Cunaviche" (no rights reserved)
"Tutankamen" (Cupertino Ríos)
"Cariño Lindo" (Folklore)

Side B
 
"Lágrimas Sobre El Estero" (Juan Vicente Torrealba) 
"La Despedida" (Folklore) 
"Los Caujaritos" (no rights reserved) 
"Caminito Verde" (Juan Briceño/Fleitas Beroes) 
"Después De Pascua" (Folklore) 
"Quinto Pasaje" (Folklore)

See also
Venezuela
Venezuelan music
Juan Vicente Torrealba

Juan Vicente Torrealba albums